Andrew Linzey (born 2 February 1952) is an English Anglican priest, theologian, and prominent figure in Christian vegetarianism. He is a member of the Faculty of Theology at the University of Oxford, and held the world's first academic post in Ethics, Theology and Animal Welfare, the Bede Jarret Senior Research Fellowship at Blackfriars Hall.

Linzey is the founder and director of the Oxford Centre for Animal Ethics, an independent academic centre opened in November 2006 to promote the study and discussion of animal ethics. He is the author of a number of books on animal rights, including Animal Rights: A Christian Perspective (1976), Christianity and the Rights of Animals (1987), Animal Theology (1994), and Why Animal Suffering Matters: Philosophy, Theology, and Practical Ethics (2009). He is also the editor of an academic journal, the Journal of Animal Ethics, which is published jointly by the Oxford Centre and the University of Illinois, and a series editor with his daughter Clair Linzey, previously with Priscilla Cohn, of the Palgrave Macmillan Animal Ethics Series.

Career
Linzey has written more than 180 articles, and authored or edited twenty books on theology and ethics. He has lectured and broadcast extensively in Europe and the United States. His Animal Theology has been translated into Italian, Spanish, Japanese, and French.

He is most often quoted as saying

He also said "Christians haven't got much further than thinking that the whole world was made for us, with the result that animals are only seen in an instrumental way as objects, machines, tools, and commodities, rather than fellow creatures", and it is claimed that he "wants to see animal abusers placed on a register and forbidden from keeping an animal, or working with them."

Honours
In 1990, he was awarded the Peaceable Kingdom Medal for outstanding work in the field of theology and animals. In June 2001, he was awarded a Doctor of Divinity degree by George Carey, Archbishop of Canterbury, in recognition of his "unique and massive pioneering work in the area of the theology of creation with particular reference to the rights and welfare of God’s sentient creatures". This is the highest award that the Archbishop can bestow on a theologian and the first time it has been awarded for work involving animals. In 2006, in recognition of his role in the creation of the Oxford Centre for Animal Ethics, Linzey was named the Henry Bergh Professor of Animal Ethics at the Graduate Theological Foundation in the US, the first such professorship of its kind in the world.

Selected works
Author
Animal Rights: A Christian Perspective (London: SCM Press, 1976)
Christianity and the Rights of Animals (London: SPCK and New York: Crossroad, 1987 and 1989)
Animal Theology (London: SCM Press and Chicago: University of Illinois Press, 1994 and 1996)
with Dan Cohn-Sherbok. After Noah: Animals and the Liberation of Theology (London: Mowbray, now Continuum, 1997)
Animal Gospel: The Christian Defense of Animals (Hodder & Stoughton Religious, 1998), 
Animal Gospel: Christian Faith as If Animals Mattered (London: Hodder and Stoughton, and Louisville, Kentucky: Westminster/John Knox Press, 1999 and 2000)
Animal Rites: Liturgies of Animal Care (London: SCM Press and Cleveland: Ohio: The Pilgrim Press, 1999 and 2001)
Creatures of the Same God: Explorations in Animal Theology (New York: Lantern Books, 2009). 
Why Animal Suffering Matters: Philosophy, Theology, and Practical Ethics (Oxford University Press, 2009). 

Editor
with Tom Regan. Song of Creation: An Anthology of Poems in Praise of Animals (London: Marshall Pickering 1988)
with Tom Regan. Animals and Christianity: A Book of Readings (London: SPCK and New York: Crossroad, 1989 and 1990)
with P.A.B. Clarke. Political Theory and Animal Rights (London: Pluto Press, 1990)
The Animal World Encyclopaedia (Kingsley Media, 2005)
with Peter Wexler. Fundamentalism and Tolerance (Canterbury Papers) Bellew Publishing, 1991, 
Dictionary of Ethics, Theology and Society (Routledge, 1995)
with Dorothy Yamamoto. Animals on the Agenda: Questions about Animals for Theology and Ethics (London: SCM Press and Chicago: University of Illinois Press, 1998 and 1999)
Gays and the Future of Anglicanism: Responses to the Windsor Report (O Books, 2005) 
with Paul Barry Clarke. Animal Rights: A Historical Anthology (Columbia University Press, 2005) 
The Global Guide to Animal Protection (University of Illinois Press, 2013), Foreword by Desmond Tutu,

See also
 Animal welfare
 
 Christianity and animal rights
 List of animal rights advocates
 RSPCA Reform Group
 Vegetarianism and religion

References

External links
 

1952 births
Living people
20th-century Church of England clergy
20th-century English Anglican priests
20th-century English theologians
21st-century Church of England clergy
21st-century English Anglican priests
21st-century English theologians
Academics of the University of Essex
Academics of the University of Nottingham
Alumni of King's College London
Animal ethicists
British vegetarianism activists
Christian ethicists
Christian vegetarianism
Christianity and environmentalism
Church of England priests
English animal rights scholars
English Anglican theologians
Fellows of Blackfriars, Oxford
Graduate Theological Foundation faculty
People associated with the Oxford Group (animal rights)